Shameyevo (Şämäy) is a rural locality (a village) in Udryakbashevsky Selsoviet, Blagovarsky District, Bashkortostan, Russia. The population was 87 as of 2010. There is 1 street.

Geography 
Shameyevo is located 29 km south of Yazykovo (the district's administrative centre) by road. Dalny and Khaydarovo are the nearest rural localities.

References 

Rural localities in Blagovarsky District